The Star Television Network (commonly branded as Starcast initially, then STN, prior to launch, then Star from its launch up to the network's shutdown), was an attempt at a fifth broadcasting network based in Orlando, Florida. The network was notable as the first television network to have featured exclusively direct response commercials and infomercials among standard programming.

Star featured classic, though cheaper and lesser-known, 1950s and 1960s programming, movies and game shows under the TV Heaven slogan, with direct response infomercials rounding out the schedule. The network expected to buy newer programs and originate their own programming once on a firm operating status.

Star was facing competition from the Home Shopping Network and Fox, which went after the bigger markets. In light of this, the network explained that its key advantage is in terms of operating costs for the station, in which a station affiliating with the network could save about 90% on their programming costs, and a national advertiser advertising on the network could pay about 68% of the major network rates.

History
The network was introduced under the Starcast branding in October 1987 as needing $15 million to launch and had just started contacting potential affiliates. The network expected to sign up 30 stations by the April 1989 launch date and have 18 hours of broadcasting a day. After the Black Monday stock market crash in October 1987, Starcast's investors pulled out. By January 1988, the company had 70 stations willing to sign on to the network.

By April 1989 (the projected launch date), the network, now under the STN branding (having changed from Starcast), pushed back their launch to July due to programming negotiations and financing hold ups. 64 stations had provisionally signed on as affiliates in markets like Los Angeles, Chicago, Philadelphia, Boston, Jacksonville, Florida and Orlando to an estimated reach of 40 million households. The network was then in talks with an additional 33 stations. At this time, an affiliation fee ranging from $2,750 to $60,000 annually would be paid by the stations based on their market size instead of the standard network payments to affiliates. 36 minutes a day would be allocated for advertising sold by the network, with the remainder given to its affiliates. STN missed the July launch due to lack of additional funding and set a new September 1 deadline for enough affiliates to sign on for a possible November 1 launch. The network expected to be based at the then-new Universal Studios Florida in Orlando. At this time, the network restructured its affiliate agreement in dropping the annual carriage fee for the addition of some infomercials and a refundable deposit of $1,500 to $175,000 based on the station's size. The number of affiliates at launch and infomercials was a requirement to bring on replacement investor Dale W. Lang, owner of Lang Communications, which then owned several magazines including Success and Working Woman magazine. The infomercials would bring a steady source of income for the network and were mostly to be provided by Quantum Marketing International.

Missing the September 1, 1989 affiliate total deadline, the network, under the Star branding (its second & final name change), pushed back its launch to September 1990. As of August 12, 1990, there were 21 signed stations reaching 13.7 million households. Also, Star moved operations to a rented studio in Winter Park, Florida. Additionally, broadcasting hours were reduced to 8 hours a day, plus 4 hours of infomercials. The network expected to have revenue reach $100 million in its second year of operations. By July 1990, Star had been granted a federal permit for a station in Austin, Minnesota.

Star launched on September 29, 1990 with 10 affiliates reaching 9 million homes, as the additional stations were not ready or failed to receive FCC approval. With fewer stations, the network sold less through the infomercials, thus not meeting company goals. The infomercial companies were having their own problems, and thus unable to produce newer shows. Lang could not add more funding into the company due to difficulties at Lang Communications. Lang and the company sought out other investors, to no avail.

Star ceased operations on Monday, January 14, 1991, at 4:00 a.m. EST. All 25 staffers working for the network were laid off.

Programming
Star's schedule was of four hours of infomercials and eight hours of classic shows under the TV Heaven slogan. Some of the programs known to have aired on Star included:
 The Invaders
 The Life of Riley
 My Little Margie
 The Rebel

Honey West, Judge Roy Bean, Mr. and Mrs. North, and Richard Diamond, Private Detective were also announced as part of Star's line-up in August 1988, though it was unknown if these series had aired.

Infomercials are listed in schedules under various names, such as Star Showcase, Star Opportunities, Star Collections, Star Sensations, Star Innovations, Market Place, Morning Star and Direct to You.

As with other networks, affiliates fill the rest of the time with their own local and syndicated programming, as well as sports, which would preempt Star programming.

Known affiliates
WAYK channel 56, Melbourne, Florida, Beach TV Partners
WAYQ channel 26, Daytona Beach, Florida Beach TV Partners; satellite of WAYK
W48AP channel 48, Toledo, Ohio
 KXLI channel 41, St. Cloud, Minnesota, owned by Dale W. Lang/Star TV Network 
 KXLT-TV channel 47, Rochester, Minnesota, satellite of KXLI, owned by Dale W. Lang/Star TV Network
 WPAN channel 53, Fort Walton Beach, Florida, owned by John Franklin Ministries
 W25AI channel 25, Cincinnati, Ohio, owned by Block Communications
KDMD channel 33, Anchorage, Alaska
KLXV channel 65, San Francisco, California
KHFT channel 29, Albuquerque, New Mexico
KBLR channel 39, Las Vegas, Nevada
KOOG channel 30, Ogden–Salt Lake City, Utah
WYED channel 17, Goldsboro, North Carolina
KBGE channel 33, Seattle, Washington
KKAK channel 61, Fresno, California
WOCD channel 55, Albany, New York

The following stations signed up as affiliates of the network, but did not commence broadcasting until after the network's closure in January 1991:

WBSV, channel 62, Venice / Sarasota, Florida; signed in May 1991
WTTA channel 38, St. Petersburg / Tampa, Florida; signed in June 1991
KSKN channel 22, Spokane, Washington; station had gone dark in 1987 and did not return to air until 1994
WNHT channel 21, Concord, New Hampshire, and WPHX Boston; the sale of both stations to Rogue Television Corp. fell through, along with the WPHX call letters for then-WHRC, and the stations did not return to air until 1995 and 1996
KJLF channel 65, El Paso, Texas; signed in June 1991
WWLA channel 35, Portland, Maine; signed on in 1997
KZAR channel 16, Provo, Utah; signed on in 1998

One announced affiliate never broadcast:
KCVF channel 40, Portland, Oregon

References

Defunct television networks in the United States
Television channels and stations established in 1990
Television channels and stations disestablished in 1991